Racheal Nicole Quigley (born 16 January 1991) is an Australian football (soccer) player who plays for West Adelaide in the Women's National Premier Leagues South Australia.

Club career

Adelaide United
After an impressive second season with Adelaide which saw Quigley score 5 goals in 10 games she was named Adelaide United's 2009–10 W-League Most Valuable Player.

Quigley scored the goal of the year in the 2011–2012 season of the Australian W-League with an over head scissor kick.

Kansas City Shock
Quigley was an inaugural player for the 2013 season of Kansas City Shock in the WPSL.

Boroondara Eagles
Quigley joined Boroondara Eagles in the Victorian Women's Premier League for the 2014 winter season alongside teammate Alexandra Gummer. She made her debut in the first round of the season, drawing with Bundoora United 0–0. She scored her debut goal in a 4–2 loss to South Melbourne and a week later scored a hat-trick to give Boroondara Eagles their first win of the season, defeating Ashburton 4–1.

Melbourne Victory
Quigley joined Melbourne Victory ahead of the 2014 season.

Bulleen Lions
In March 2015, Quigley joined Bulleen Lions in the Victorian Women's Premier League. They were runners-up in the women's statewide knockout cup, with Quigley scoring in the 5–3 loss to Boroondara Eagles in the final.

Melbourne City
Quigley made a guest appearance for Melbourne City on 25 October 2015, helping Melbourne City beat Melbourne Victory 2–1 in the Melbourne Derby.

Hwacheon KSPO
In February 2016, Quigley joined Hwacheon KSPO in the South Korean WK League after an agent saw football footage of her on YouTube. In her debut game she started on the bench and came on in the second half to score the winning goal, giving Hwacheon KSPO a 2–1 victory against Suwon FMC.

Return to Adelaide United
On 20 September 2016, Quigley confirmed during an interview with The Women's Game that she will be returning to Australia to play for Adelaide United in the 2016–17 season.

References 

Australian women's soccer players
1991 births
Living people
Adelaide United FC (A-League Women) players
Melbourne Victory FC (A-League Women) players
Melbourne City FC (A-League Women) players
WK League players
Women's association football forwards